Piperno is a magmatic rock present in areas where there has been volcanic activity. Piperno abounds in Campania; the areas from which it was obtained were the city of Quarto, Soccavo, Pianura and Nocera Inferiore. The Piperno layer, with the overlying Breccia Museo, is clearly visible at the base of the Camaldoli hill, in the Soccavo and Verdolino areas.

This type of lithified rock, different from yellow tuff, takes on a particular texture characterised by the orientation of lenticular concentrations of grey colour, called flames, immersed in a matrix of the same colour but lighter.

Piperno rock is not easy to extract, and is helped by underground separation of the large blocks that are subsequently worked; it is resistant to the wear and tear of atmospheric agents and for this reason it has been widely used for the cladding of buildings in Naples. Currently it is no longer extracted as the underground quarries in Pianura and Soccavo are exhausted.

References

Geology
Volcanic rocks